Johannes Spillmann (born 2 February 1969, in Heerlen) is a retired Dutch professional footballer who last played as a goalkeeper for NRW-Liga team Alemannia Aachen II.

Career
Spillmann signed 31 January 2008 with Alemannia Aachen, he comes from FC Geleen-Zuid.

Coaching career
On 1 February 2008 was named as the Goalkeeper Coach of Alemannia Aachen youth and will in July 2009 begin to coaching the goalkeepers by Roda JC. For the 2017/2018 season he is working as a goalkeeping coach at MVV Maastricht. Since 2019 he is Goalkeeper Coach of Alemannia Aachen. Next to that, as hobby, he coaches the amateurs of Rood-Groen LVC'01

Honours
Roda JC
KNVB Cup: 1996–97

References

External links
 Voetbal International Profile

1969 births
Living people
Dutch footballers
MVV Maastricht players
Eredivisie players
Footballers from Haarlem
Roda JC Kerkrade players
Alemannia Aachen players

Association football goalkeepers